The 1954 South American Championships in Athletics  were held in Brazil's largest city, São Paulo, between 17 and 25 April.

Medal summary

Men's events

Women's events

Medal table

External links
 Men Results – GBR Athletics
 Women Results – GBR Athletics

S
South American Championships in Athletics
A
1954 in South American sport
International athletics competitions hosted by Brazil